Bull and terrier was a common name for bulldog and terrier crossbreeds of the early 1800s. Other names included half-and-halfs and half-breds. It was a time in history when, for thousands of years, dogs were classified by use or function, unlike the modern pets of today that were bred to be conformation show dogs and family pets. Bull and terrier crosses were originally bred to function as fighting dogs for bull and bear baiting, and other popular blood sports during the Victorian era. The sport of bull baiting required a dog with attributes such as tenacity and courage, a wide frame with heavy bone, and a muscular, protruding jaw. By crossing bulldogs with various terriers from Ireland and Great Britain, breeders introduced "gameness and agility" into the hybrid mix.

Little is known about the pedigrees of bull and terrier crosses, or any other crosses that originated during that time. The types and styles of dogs varied geographically depending on individual preferences. Breeders in one area may have preferred a cross with a higher percentage of terrier than bulldog. Some early anecdotal reports indicate that bulldog to terrier was preferred over bull and terrier to bull terrier, which was likely to have resulted in at least half or more bulldog blood. The bull and terrier was never a bona fide breed; rather, it referred to a heterogeneous group of dogs that may include purebreds involving different breeds, as well as dogs believed to be crosses of those breeds. Those crossbreeds or hybrids are considered the forerunner of several modern standardised breeds.

In the mid-1830s, when enforcement of the ban on bull baiting had begun, the popularity of the original purebred bulldogs declined, and a major shift in canine genetics was occurring. The appearance of certain dogs were being altered by crossbreeding to better suit function. Not only were appearances of dogs changing, so was the terminology used to describe various breeds and dog types as recorded in ancient records. Such changes began casting doubts over the bulldog's earliest known ancestors.

Terminology

One example of how changing terminology over the centuries has caused confusion is the ubiquitous misuse of descriptors. For example, mastiff is a common descriptor for all large dogs, which created a cloud over the earliest origins of the bulldog. The Alaunt was once believed to be the likely ancestor of bulldogs and mastiffs, both of which came from Asia; others believed bulldogs descended only from mastiffs.

Over the centuries, hybrid bull and terrier crosses have been labeled with several aliases, such as half-and-half, half-bred, pit dog, bulldog terrier and pit bulldog. The most popular name was bull-terrier, a name later applied to the breed  James Hinks was developing in the latter half of the 19th century. There are also many paintings, texts, and engravings created during or prior to this period that labeled the bull-and-terrier only as "bull-terrier". Hinks was still developing his new bull terrier, nicknamed White Cavalier, which he presented at the Birmingham show in May 1862.  

The term pit bull terrier was sometimes applied, though later applied when naming the American Pit Bull Terrier, a modern standardised breed. The term "pit bull" is a ubiquitous term that is often misused to infer that the pit bull is a bona fide breed of dog, when it actually refers to a diverse group of dogs that may include purebred dogs of many breeds as well as dogs that are assumed to be blends of those breeds. These types of descriptors vary, depending on the recognized breeds and observers' perspectives. Despite anecdotal misinformation and incorrect visual identification, dog owners, animal shelters, veterinarians and the general public routinely use the term "pit bull" in casual and official papers as though it denotes a single, recognized breed.

History 

Bulldogs of the 1800s were described as having a "round head, short nose, small ears and wide, muscular frame and legs." Their temperament has been described as being more aggressive and ferocious than other dogs of the time. It is believed their ancestors may have been mastiffs of Asian descent because of their aggressive tendencies and strength, but the term "mastiff" was used as a general reference for large dogs. Whether or not they were crossed with Pugs to make them better at bull baiting remains controversial. 

It is assumed that bull and terrier hybrids were crossed with several varieties of bulldogs and terriers, the types of which depended on location. A 2016 genetic assessment verified that bulldogs were descendants of mastiffs, but it also discovered pugs in the cross. The assessment, which analyzed a particular group of individual English bulldogs, used DNA rather than pedigrees to confirm that genetic diversity actually still exists. It further confirmed a substantial loss of genetic diversity in the breed resulting from a small founder population of about 68 individuals. The impact of focused selection for breeding dogs with specific physical traits created artificial genetic bottlenecks. 

In Ireland, they used the old Irish bulldog with different terriers and some insertion of hunting sighthound/terrier crosses. In England, there were several varieties such as the Walsall and the Cradley Heath types. Phil Drabble reported that among the various types of bull and terrier, the type from Cradley Heath was recognised as a separate breed to be named the Staffordshire Bull Terrier. In the 19th century, the Walsall type was carried by immigrants to the United States, where it served as an important component for the genetic basis of the American Pit Bull Terrier breed, through specimens such as the dog Lloyd's Pilot and the Colby bloodline, strongly combined with Irish strains. The anatomy of the bull and terrier is the result of selective breeding for the purpose of hunting, dog fighting and baiting.

Descendants
In “Popular and Illustrated Dog Encyclopaedia” (1934-5), Major Mitford Price wrote, “The original Bull Terrier, or Bull-and-Terrier, as he was then styled, bred for fighting in the pits, bore a far closer resemblance to the Bulldog of that day than to his terrier forbears: for there exists scores of old prints as evidence that the old Bulldog, as well as the Bull-and-Terrier had the unexaggerated (in comparison with the absurd modern standards) Bulldog head, and the legs, straight and longer, of the terrier. At the same time that the new Bull-and-Terrier made its appearance, the Bulldog fanciers began breeding their animals heavier and lower to the ground, so that the Bulldog acquired a new type.

Six distinct breeds descended from the bull and terrier hybrids, five of which were recognized by the American Kennel Club (AKC) in the following order: Bull Terrier, Boston Terrier, American Staffordshire Terrier (AmStaff), Staffordshire Bull Terrier, Miniature Bull Terrier. All five breeds have also been recognized by the Canadian Kennel Club (CKC), and Fédération cynologique internationale (FCI). The American Pit Bull Terrier (APBT) is recognized by the United Kennel Club (UKC), Canadian Kennel Club, and American Dog Breeders Association. The Kennel Club recognizes four of the named breeds but does not accept the AmStaff or APBT.

DNA analysis
Geneticists have been able to further refine the sparse historical aspects of breed formation, and the time of hybridization. A 2017 genome-wide research study suggests the following: "In this analysis, all of the bull and terrier crosses map to the terriers of Ireland and date to 1860-1870. This coincides perfectly with the historical descriptions that, though they do not clearly identify all breeds involved, report the popularity of dog contests in Ireland and the lack of stud book veracity, hence undocumented crosses, during this era of breed creation (Lee, 1894)."

It also confirms that the bull and terrier was a heterogeneous group of dogs that may include purebreds involving different breeds, as well as dogs believed to be crosses of those breeds. By 1874, in Britain the first Kennel Club Stud Book was published, which included Bull Terriers and Bulldogs.

Hunters 

Some believe that the courage of most terriers, both past and present, to bear the bites of badgers and other prey they are meant to corner, dig for, or attack is derived from having a quarter to an eighth of Old English Bulldog ancestry. Other terriers that were not developed by crossing Old English Bulldogs and earth-working dogs were believed to be of inferior quality and were valued far less. There are earth-working dogs who by default and definition are called terriers because they have the ability to go to ground; however, the best earth-working and hunting terriers were regarded as the progeny of bulldogs bred to earth-working dogs (terriers), with the offspring known as bull-terriers or half-bred dogs, among other names.

Walsh also wrote of the Fox Terrier (or, rather, of its cross-breed ancestor): "The field fox-terrier, used for bolting the fox when gone to ground, was of this breed [bull and terrier]." Not only is the Fox Terrier the progeny of the bull-and-terrier, but so is the Airedale Terrier, rat-working terriers, working black and tan terriers and most all other vermin-hunting terriers. James Rodwell described in his book titled The Rat: Its History and Destructive Nature, that the great object, among the various breeders of bull-and-terrier dogs for hunting vermin and rats, was to have them as nearly thorough-bred bull as possible, but at the same time preserving all the outward appearances of the terrier as to size, shape and colour.

Dog fighting 

In the 19th century, breeders crossed Bulldogs and English White Terriers to produce fighting dogs that were the forebears of the modern Bull Terrier breed. When blood sports were banned in the early 1800s, breeders continued with their clandestine dog fights in discreet venues, such as basements and warehouses. A major shift in canine genetics occurred during the Victorian era, at which time the appearance of certain dogs were being actively altered. The early bulldogs of the 1800s were described as having a "round head, short nose, small ears and wide, muscular frame and legs." In the 1830s, the ban on bull baiting was being strictly enforced, and with it, a noticeable decline in the popularity of the original bulldogs. Breeders had already begun crossing bulldogs with terriers for clandestine pit fighting.

James Hinks, a dog breeder in Birmingham, is credited for his role in helping to standardize the bull and terrier hybrid. Hinks introduced new blood, presumably Collies to add length to the muzzle. His version was becoming a more streamlined version of the bulldog and terrier hybrid while still maintaining substance. Hink's son said that, early on, his father also used Dalmatians to create the Bull Terrier's striking all-white coat. Others have suggested that Hinks straightened the bulldog's tendency for bowed legs by adding Pointer blood, or possibly Greyhound. Hink's son recalled, “In short, they became the old fighting dog civilized, with all of his rough edges smoothed down without being softened; alert, active, plucky, muscular, and a real gentleman.” Hink's early Bull Terriers were white which gave rise to congenital sensorineural deafness (CSD), a genetic condition linked to coat colour phenotypes in English bull terriers with genetic variations that go beyond coat colour. The appearance of the Bull Terrier continued to change over time, and by the 20th century its egg-shaped head had become more prominent, soon to be standardized along with the various colors that had been introduced.

Famous bull and terriers 
According to accounts in Sporting Magazine from the year 1804, a bull and terrier named Trusty (owned by Thomas Pitt, 2nd Baron Camelford) was just as famous throughout England as the Emperor Napoleon. Trusty went undefeated in 104 dog fights. In 1812, Sporting Magazine described another a famous and talented dog, Dustman, as representing the optimal bull-and-terrier type.

A celebrated bull and terrier named Billy, weighing approximately 26 pounds; "his most notable feat was killing 100 rats in 5 min 30 sec at the Cockpit in Tufton Street, Westminster, London, UK on 23 April 1825."

See also 

 Bulldog type
 Terrier

References 

Terriers
Dog crossbreeds
Dog fighting breeds
Dog types